The men's 3000 metres steeplechase event at the 2021 European Athletics U23 Championships was held in Tallinn, Estonia, at Kadriorg Stadium on 9 and 11 July.

Records
Prior to the competition, the records were as follows:

Results

Round 1
Qualification rule: First 4 in each heat (Q) and the next 3 fastest (q) advance to the Final.

Final

References

3000 metres
Steeplechase at the European Athletics U23 Championships